Goar Mestre Espinosa (born December 25, 1912 – March 23, 1994) was a Cuban-born Argentine businessman, remembered as one of the pioneers of the audiovisual industry in Latin America. He owned several broadcasters, led by CMQ.

Death 
Goar Mestre died on March 23, 1994 at the age of 81. His wife Alicia Martín, whom he married in 1940 and had four children and 12 grandchildren, died a week later.

References

1912 births
1994 deaths
Cuban emigrants to Argentina
20th-century Argentine businesspeople
International Emmy Founders Award winners
Deaths from cancer in Argentina